Petrosaurus mearnsi, also called the banded rock lizard, is a species of lizard in the family Phrynosomatidae. The species is native to western North America.

Etymology
The specific name, mearnsi, is in honor of American naturalist Edgar Alexander Mearns, who collected the first specimens.

Geographic range
P. mearnsi is endemic to extreme southern California and Baja California, Mexico. It also occurs on Isla El Muerto.

Description
P. mearnsi is an extremely flat-bodied lizard. Its dorsum is olive, brown or gray, with white or bluish spots. It has a single black collar, a banded tail, and granular scales on its body, with keeled tail and limb scales. Males have more pronounced throat patterns and brighter blue coloring than females.

Habitat
P. mearnsi is associated with boulder hillsides, extending in Baja California to chaparral and pinyon-juniper woodlands.

Diet
P. mearnsi is omnivorous, feeding not only on insects and spiders, but also on buds and flowers.

Reproduction
Gravid females of P. mearnsi lay eggs from June through August. Clutch size varies from 2 to 6 eggs.

References

Sources
This article is based on a description from "A Field Guide to the Reptiles and Amphibians of Coastal Southern California", Robert N. Fisher and Ted J. Case, USGS, http://www.werc.usgs.gov/fieldguide/index.htm.

Further reading
Schulze Niehoff P (2018). "Mearns’ Rock Lizard, Petrosaurus mearnsi (Stejneger, 1894) – its natural history, captive care and first breeding record". Sauria (Berlin) 40 (1): 58–74.
Stejneger L (1894). "Description of Uta mearnsi, a new Lizard from California". Proceedings of the United States National Museum 17: 589–591. (Uta mearnsi, new species)

mearnsi
Reptiles described in 1894
Taxa named by Leonhard Stejneger
Reptiles of Mexico
Reptiles of the United States
Fauna of the California chaparral and woodlands